Ust-Chyornaya is a rural locality (a settlement) in Gaynsky District, Perm Krai, Russia. The population was 1,078 as of 2010. There are 14 streets.

Geography 
Ust-Chyornaya is located 109 km west of Gayny (the district's administrative centre) by road. Serebryanka is the nearest rural locality.

References 

Rural localities in Gaynsky District